Cruentis is a progressive black metal band that originated out of Quesnel, British Columbia, Canada. The band began in 2012 with the lineup of Jesse Dean and Tyler DeMerchant. The band was signed with Madison, Wisconsin-based label Nosral Recordings until the label's disbandment in 2019.

History
Cruentis began in 2012, between two friends Tyler DeMerchant on Vocals/Bass and Jesse Dean on Vocals/Guitars. The band added on Matt Sargent on Lead Guitars shortly afterward. The band, despite forming in 2012, remained musically silent until 2016. The band then recorded their debut album, Cold Stone, with the title track and "The Blood That Divides" being released as singles prior to the album's release. Cold Stone was released independently. Following the release of the album, they added Daniel Willsmore on drums, and recorded an EP, Dichotomy. However, following the EP's release, both Sargent and Willsmore seemingly departed from the band, leaving only founding members DeMerchant and Dean left in the band. The band would continue on as a two-piece, as both understood how to perform drums. In 2018, the band would sign with Nosral Recordings, home to bands such as Symphony of Heaven, Light Unseen, and Ascending King. Following their signing with the label, the band released their sophomore album, Alpha & Omega, with a lyric video for the title track also being released. The album received mixed to good reviews, with several sites giving a review rating of 7 or 8 out of 10. Nosral Recordings has since been disbanded, and Cruentis remains unsigned thus far. In December 2020, Cruentis signed with Hagah Recordings, a subsidiary of Rottweiler Records, joining the roster alongside Mangled Carpenter and Nosral alum INRI Immortal.

Influences and style
The band have claimed several melodic death metal and black metal influences, including Kalmah, Dimmu Borgir, Amon Amarth, and Opeth. However, the band have been compared to Extol, Pantokrator, Not Beneath, At the Gates, World to Ashes, and In Flames, with comparisons of progressive metal, nu metal, doom metal, and hardcore punk.

Members
Current
Tyler DeMerchant - Vocals, Rhythm Guitars (2012–present), Lead Guitars (2012, 2017–present)
Jesse Dean - Vocals, Bass (2012–present)

Former
Matt Sargent - Lead Guitars (2012-2018)
Daniel Willsmore - Drums (2016-2018)

Timeline

Discography
Studio albums
Cold Stone (2016)
Alpha and Omega (2018)
Alpha and Omega (2021; remastered)

EPs
Dichotomy (2017)

Singles
"Cold Stone" (2015)
"The Blood That Divides" (2015)
"Alpha and Omega" (2017)

Compilation appearances
All Things Christian Extreme Metal Volume 1 (2016)

References

External links
Twitter
Cruentis albums

Canadian Christian metal musical groups
Canadian black metal musical groups
Canadian progressive metal musical groups
Canadian heavy metal musical groups
Nosral Recordings artists
Musical groups established in 2012
2012 establishments in British Columbia